The 2021 FIA Masters Historic Formula One Championship was the ninth season of the FIA Masters Historic Formula One Championship. It began at Donington Park on 2 April and ended at Algarve International Circuit on 31 October.

Cars and drivers

Race results
Bold indicates overall winner.

Championships standings

References

External links

2021
Masters Historic Formula One Championship
Masters Historic Formula One Championship